The  is an annual awards ceremony held in Yokohama, Japan. Ten films are chosen as the best of the year and various awards are given to personnel. The first festival, held on February 3, 1980, was a small affair by fans and film critics. In 1994, France announced plans to help sponsor the festival with grants from the National Cinema Center.

Ceremonies

Categories
Best Film
Best Actor
Best Actress
Best Supporting Actor
Best Supporting Actress
Best Director
Best New Director
Best Screenplay
Best Cinematographer
Best Newcomer
Special Jury Prize
Best New Actor
Best New Actress

References

External links
  
 Yokohama Film Festival - Overview on IMDb

 
Awards established in 1980
Film festivals in Japan
Japanese awards
Lists of films by award
1980 establishments in Japan
Tourist attractions in Yokohama
Festivals in Kanagawa Prefecture